Byron Robinson (1900–1957) was an American film editor. He worked for a variety of studios including Tiffany Pictures, Universal Pictures, Mayfair Pictures and Columbia Pictures.

Filmography

 The Devil's Partner (1926)
 Alias the Deacon (1927)
 Uncle Tom's Cabin (1927)
 Lingerie (1928)
 Domestic Meddlers (1928)
 The Power of Silence (1928)
 Midnight Rose (1928)
 The Albany Night Boat (1928)
 Broadway Fever (1929)
 The Shannons of Broadway (1929)
 The Medicine Man (1930)
 Borrowed Wives (1930)
 Paradise Island (1930)
 Chinatown After Dark (1931)
 Anybody's Blonde (1931)
 Dragnet Patrol (1931)
 Night Beat (1931)
 Soul of the Slums (1931)
 Graft (1931)
 Dynamite Denny (1932)
 The Monster Walks (1932)
 The Midnight Warning (1932)
 Gorilla Ship (1932)
 Tangled Destinies (1932)
 Sally of the Subway (1932)
 Temptation's Workshop (1932)
 Docks of San Francisco (1932)
 Passport to Paradise (1932)
 Love in High Gear (1932)
 The Widow in Scarlet (1932)
 Sin's Pay Day (1932)
 Behind Stone Walls (1932)
 No Living Witness (1932)
 Sister to Judas (1932)
 Alias Mary Smith (1932)
 Malay Nights (1932)
 Her Mad Night (1932)
 Midnight Morals (1932)
 Easy Millions (1933)
 The Big Bluff (1933)
 Justice Takes a Holiday (1933)
 Dance Hall Hostess (1933)
 Three Kids and a Queen (1935)
 Come Closer, Folks (1936)
 Crash Donovan (1936)
 The Man Who Lived Twice (1936)
 Paid to Dance (1937)
 Motor Madness (1937)
 Girls Can Play (1937)
 Woman in Distress (1937)
 The Shadow (1937)
 Who Killed Gail Preston? (1938)
 Juvenile Court (1938)
 Romance of the Redwoods (1939)
 A Woman Is the Judge (1939)

References

Bibliography
 Pitts, Michael R. Poverty Row Studios, 1929–1940: An Illustrated History of 55 Independent Film Companies, with a Filmography for Each. McFarland & Company, 2005.

External links

1900 births
1957 deaths
American film editors
People from Longview, Texas